Note that this page is about the singer-songwriter and the similarly named band

Meghan Elisse Mahowald (born February 7, 1991), better known by her stage name MEGG, is an American singer, songwriter, and musician based in Los Angeles, California. She is best known as the pop rock act MEGG, which is also the name of her band. She was a former member of the all-girl pop group Runway MMC.

Personal history
Born and raised in Redondo Beach, California, Mahowald has been singing and writing music since she was eight years old. She attended the Los Angeles County High School for the Arts (LACHSA), where she starred in musical performances such as Les Misérables and Annie.

Upon graduating from high school, Mahowald was accepted to the Popular Music Program at the USC Thornton School of Music. While attending USC, MEGG has performed at many school concerts and events.

Musical career

Runway MMC
From 2006 to 2008, Mahowald was a member of the all-girl pop act Runway MMC. The group, which also featured Chelsea Tavares and Melody Hernandez, released their EP Forever Yours on iTunes in October 2008, as well as a corresponding clothing line which was sold by Wet Seal.

Discography

EPs
2008: Forever Yours (credited to Runway MMC)
2010: The EP (credited to MEGG)

References

Living people
1991 births
Musicians from Los Angeles
American women singer-songwriters
USC Thornton School of Music alumni
Singer-songwriters from California
21st-century American singers
21st-century American women singers